Pristaulacus is a genus of aulacids, ensigns, and gasteruptiids in the Hymenopteran family, Aulacidae. There are at least 130 described species in Pristaulacus.

See also
 List of Pristaulacus species

References

Further reading

External links

 

Parasitic wasps
Articles created by Qbugbot
Evanioidea